The Baptist War, also known as the Sam Sharp Rebellion, the Christmas Rebellion, the Christmas Uprising and the Great Jamaican Slave Revolt of 1831–32, was an eleven-day rebellion that started on 25 December 1831 and involved up to 60,000 of the 300,000 slaves in the Colony of Jamaica. The uprising was led by a black Baptist deacon, Samuel Sharpe, and waged largely by his followers. The revolt, though militarily unsuccessful, played a major part in the abolition of slavery throughout the British Empire.

Ideology 
The missionary-educated rebels had been following progress of the abolitionist movement in London; their intention was to call a peaceful general strike. Compared with their Presbyterian, Wesleyan, and Moravian counterparts, Baptist slaves seemed more ready to take action. This may have reflected a higher level of absenteeism among white Baptist missionaries. The relative independence of Black deacons facilitated slaves taking greater ownership over their religious life, including reinterpretations of Baptist theology in terms of their experience (for example, they placed an emphasis on the role of John the Baptist, sometimes at the expense of Jesus.)

Thomas Burchell, a missionary in Montego Bay, returned from England following Christmas vacation. Many of the Baptist ministry expected that he would return with papers for emancipation from the king, William IV. They also thought that the King's men would enforce the order and discontent escalated among slaves when the Jamaican governor announced that no emancipation had been granted.

The strike and the uprising 
Led by 'native' Baptist preacher Samuel Sharpe, enslaved black workers demanded more freedom and a working wage of "half the going wage rate"; they took an oath to stay away from work until their demands were met by the plantation owners. The enslaved laborers believed that the work stoppage could achieve their ends alone – a resort to force was only envisaged if violence was used against them. Sharpe was the inspiration for the rebellion, and was nicknamed "Daddy" Sharpe. His military commanders were mainly literate slaves, like him, and they included Johnson, a carpenter called Campbell from York estate, a waggoner from Greenwich estate named Robert Gardner, Thomas Dove from Belvedere estate, John Tharp from Hazlelymph estate, and George Taylor, who, like Sharpe, was a deacon in Burchell's chapel.

It became the largest slave uprising in the British West Indies, mobilizing as many as 60,000 of Jamaica's 300,000 slaves. During the rebellion, fourteen whites were killed by armed slave battalions and 207 rebels were killed.

The rebellion exploded on December 27, when slaves set fire to Kensington estate, in the hills above Montego Bay. Colonel William Grignon of the militia was an attorney who ran several estates, including one at Salt Spring, where a series of incidents in December were the sparks for the uprising. 

Grignon led the militia against the rebels at Belvedere estate, but he was forced to retreat, leaving the rebels in command of the rural areas of the parish of St James.

On December 31, the colonial authorities instituted martial law. Sir Willoughby Cotton, who commanded the British forces, then summoned the Jamaican Maroons of Accompong Town to help suppress the rebellion in the second week of January. However, when the Accompong Maroons attacked the rebels at Catadupa, they were forced to withdraw because the rebels were "too strong".

The Accompong Maroons soon gained the upper hand however, and they defeated the rebels in one skirmish, killing one of Sharpe's deputies, Campbell, in the assault. When the army regulars were besieged by the rebels at Maroon Town, the Accompong Maroons relieved them, killing more rebels, and capturing scores of them, including another of Sharpe's deputies, Dehany.

When the Windward Maroons from Charles Town, Jamaica and Moore Town answered the call of Cotton, the rebel cause was lost. These eastern Maroons killed and captured a number of other rebels, including another leader named Gillespie. One of the last leaders of the rebels, Gardner, surrendered when he heard the Charles Town Maroons had joined the fight against them.

Suppression and death toll 
The rebellion was quickly suppressed by the colonial authorities. The reaction of the colonial government and reprisals of the plantocracy were far more brutal than any actions undertaken by the rebels; approximately 500 slaves were killed, with 207 killed outright during the revolt. After the rebellion, an estimated 310 to 340 slaves were killed through "various forms of judicial executions". At times, slaves were executed for quite minor offenses (one recorded execution was for the theft of a pig; another, a cow). An 1853 account by Henry Bleby described how the courts commonly executed three or four persons simultaneously; bodies were piled up until the black people relegated to the workhouse carted the bodies away at night and buried them in mass graves outside town.

After the rebellion, property damage was estimated in the Jamaican Assembly summary report in March 1832 at £1,154,589 (roughly £124,000,000 in 2021). Thousands of rebels had set fire to more than 100 properties, destroying over 40 sugar works and the houses of nearly 100 planters.

The planters suspected many missionaries of having encouraged the rebellion. Some, such as William Knibb and Bleby, were arrested, tarred and feathered, but later released. Groups of white colonials destroyed chapels that housed black congregations.

Aftermath
As a result of the Baptist War, hundreds of slaves ran away into the Cockpit Country in order to avoid being forced back into slavery. The Maroons were only successful in apprehending a small number of these runaway slaves. Many runaways remained free and at large when the British parliament passed the Act abolishing slavery in 1833.

Historians argue that the brutality of the Jamaican plantocracy during the revolt accelerated the British political process of emancipating the slaves. When Burchell and Knibb described how badly they were treated by the colonial militias, the House of Commons expressed their outrage that white planters could have tarred and feathered white missionaries. Parliament passed the Slavery Abolition Act 1833 for initial measures to begin in 1834, followed by partial emancipation (outright for children six or under, six years' apprenticeship for the rest) in 1834 and then unconditional emancipation of chattel slavery in 1838.

In literature
 Andrea Levy's 2010 novel The Long Song recounts, through a fictional narrative, the events of the Baptist War.
 The 1929 novel The White Witch of Rosehall, by Herbert G. de Lisser, has a climax set in Rose Hall at the time of the Baptist War.

Notes

Further reading
 Craton, Michael: The Economics of Emancipation: Jamaica and Barbados, 1823–1843 (University of North Carolina Press, Chapel Hill 1995).
 Heuman, Gad: "A Tale of Two Jamaican Rebellions," in: Jamaican Historical Review (1996), 19: pp. 1–8.
 
 Morrison, Doreen: Slavery's Heroes: George Liele and the Ethiopian Baptists of Jamaica 1783-1865, 2004, CreateSpace. .
 Reckord, Mary: The Jamaican Slave Rebellion of 1831. Past and Present (July 1968), 40(3): pp. 108–125.
 Rodriguez, Junius P. (ed.): Encyclopedia of Slave Resistance and Rebellion, Westport 2006, CT: Greenwood.
 Short, K.R.M.: "Jamaican Christian Missions and the Great Slave Rebellion of 1831–2," in: Journal of Ecclesiastical History, (1976), 27(1): pp. 57–72.
 Turner, Mary: Slaves and Missionaries : The Disintegration of Jamaican Slave Society, 1787–1834 (University of Illinois Press, 1982).

Afro-Caribbean history
History of the Colony of Jamaica
Baptist Christianity
Slave rebellions in North America
Conflicts in 1831
Conflicts in 1832
19th-century rebellions
Wars involving Jamaica
1831 in Jamaica
Abolitionism in Jamaica
1832 in Jamaica
19th-century history of the British Army
December 1831 events
January 1832 events